The Legislature of Manitoba is the legislature of the province of Manitoba, Canada. Today, the legislature is made of two elements: the King of Canada in Right of Manitoba, represented by the lieutenant governor of Manitoba, and the unicameral assembly called the Legislative Assembly of Manitoba. The legislature has existed since Manitoba was formed out of part of Rupert's Land in 1870.

Like the Canadian federal government, Manitoba uses a Westminster-style parliamentary government, in which members are sent to the Legislative Assembly after general elections and from there the party with the most seats chooses a Premier of Manitoba and Executive Council of Manitoba.  The premier acts as Manitoba's head of government, while the King of Canada acts as its head of state.

An upper house, the Legislative Council of Manitoba, was established in 1870 but was abolished in 1876 as a cost-cutting measure and as a condition for federal funding.

Before 1879, candidates in Manitoba elections were not affiliated with political parties. However, some candidates declared their support for (or opposition to) the administration of the time.

List of Legislatures
Following is a list of all the legislatures convened since 1870.

Notes:

References 

 
1870 establishments in Manitoba
Tourist attractions in Winnipeg